Czech Republic is competing at the 2014 European Athletics Championships in Zürich, Switzerland, from 12–17 August 2014. A delegation of 42 athletes were sent to represent the country.

Medals

Results

Men

Track

Field

Combined events – Decathlon

Women

Track

Field

Combined events – Heptathlon

References

Nations at the 2014 European Athletics Championships
2014
European Athletics Championships